The Festival International du Film Francophone de Namur (FIFF) is a festival dedicated to French speaking films in Namur, Belgium created in 1986, reflecting francophone diversity, from Europe, Canada and Africa.

History
The festival is created in 1986 as "Festival cinématographique de Wallonie" (Film festival of Wallonia).

Since 1988, the festival is recognized by the Organisation internationale de la Francophonie.

In 1989, the association changed its name to "Festival International du Film Francophone de Namur" and is recognized by FIAPF as a specialized competitive festival, it now acquires the right to award with Bayards d'Or (best film, best actor, best actress and Special Jury Prize).

See also
 Francophonie

References

External links
 Official site 

Film festivals in Belgium
Recurring events established in 1986
1986 establishments in Belgium